Tengku Abdul Rahman may refer to:

 Abdul Rahman (Sultan of Johor), Sultan of Johor when Singapore was founded in 1819
Tuanku Abdul Rahman, first Yang di-Pertuan Agong, the Malaysian king and the Yang di-Pertuan Besar of the Malaysian state of Negeri Sembilan
 Tunku Abdul Rahman, first prime minister of Malaysia, prime minister of Federation of Malaya and also president of UMNO
Tunku Abdul Rahman (born 1933), younger brother of Sultan Iskandar of Johor, who also served as crown prince of Johor from 1961 to 1981
Tunku Abdul Rahman Hassanal Jeffri, 4th son of the Sultan of Johor, Sultan Ibrahim Ismail

See also
Tuanku Abdul Rahman Stadium
KD Tunku Abdul Rahman, a submarine of the Royal Malaysian Navy
Jalan Tuanku Abdul Rahman, a road in Kuala Lumpur, Malaysia
Universiti Tunku Abdul Rahman
Tunku Abdul Rahman College
Tunku Abdul Rahman National Park
Sekolah Tuanku Abdul Rahman
Tunku Abdul Rahman Foundation